Torbat-e Heydarieh (also Romanized as Torbat-e Ḩeydarīyeh; also known as Torbat-e Heydari, Turbat-i-Haidari, Torbate Heydari, and Turbet-i-Haidari, and for short Torbat) is a city and capital of Torbat-e Heydarieh County, in Razavi Khorasan Province, Iran. At the 2006 census, its population was 119,360, in 31,869 families. The closest major city to Torbat is Mashhad and it is 157 Kilometers away.

The name Torbat in Persian means Burial place, thus the name of the city means Burial Place of Heydar named after Qutb ad-Dīn Haydar a Sufi mystic whose tomb lies in the heart of the city.

In ancient times this city was known as Zaveh and in the 19th century it was known as Torbat-e Ishaq Khan or Torbat-e Isa Khan after Ishaq Khan Qaraei the powerful chief of the local Qarai Turks who ruled as a semi-autonomous governor of Torbat-e Heydarieh from 1775 to 1816. It derives its present name from the turbet or tomb of a holy man named Kutb ed din Haidar, the founder of the ascetic sect of dervishes known as the Haidaris. He died c. 1230 and is buried in a large domed building a short distance outside the town.

The city is located in the center of Razavi Khorasan province in Iran. This city is famous for its Zafaran (Saffron) fields. Torbat-e Heydarieh is the world's largest Saffron  (or Zafaran in Persian) producer hence the nickname "Capital of the Red Gold of Iran" has been given to it.

History 
Following the Mongol invasion of Iran, the people of Zaveh (Old Torbat) were the first victims of the Mongol invasion. At the same time, Qutbuddin Haidar, a famous sixth-century mystic who had long resided in the city of Zaveh, died. Torbat-e Heydarieh became a city after the Safavid period. In fact, the city flourished about two hundred years ago, during the reign of Ishaq Khan Qaraei, one of the Khans and political figures of the Qajar era. Ishaq Khan renovated and developed the city and it created such a massive change in the city that this city has become known as Ishaq Khan Torbat for a long time. Prior to World War II, the British and Russian consulates were located in Torbat-e Heydarieh, in the Bagh-e-Soltani area of ​​the city, indicating the city's political and economic importance at the time.

Language and people 
The people of Torbat Heydariyeh speak Persian and Khorasani dialect. The dialect of the people of Torbat Heydariyeh is very close to the dialect of other cities of Khorasan, especially the dialect of Mashhad. Books of poems with Torbati accent such as Samandar Khan Salar written by Ali Akbar Abbasi Fahandari and also Torbati shout by Mohammad Ghahraman have been written.

Population 
According to the general census of 2016, the population of this city was 140,019 people (in 43,029 households), which in this regard is ranked fourth in the province. The total population of Torbat Heydariyeh is 224,626 people. Until 1372, the city of Torbat Heydariyeh had the second largest population in the province of Greater Khorasan after Mashhad, which was divided into 5 cities, making its population rank reduced.

Universities and higher education centers 
Torbat Heydariyeh in recent years as a university hub in Khorasan Razavi, has good higher education facilities. Torbat Heydariyeh Higher Education Centers are:

Islamic Azad University Torbat Heydarieh

Torbat Heydariyeh University

Torbat Heydariyeh University of Medical Sciences

Mines and industries 
Torbat Heydariyeh has two industrial towns and the most important industrial production units of the city include Torbat Heydariyeh Sugar Factory, Zarmehr Gold, Zarrin Tile, Kaolin Factory, also products such as milk and dairies, flour, cumin and cotton gin, animal feed and silk works are also produced in Torbat.

Climate

Photo gallery

Notable people
 Mahmoud Shehabi Khorassani,born 1903 in Torbat-e Heydarieh, died in 1986 in Mulhouse, France; a lawyer, a high-ranking philosopher and one of the most famous and eminent jurists of the Pahlavi era.  He was a distinguished and emeritus professor at the University of Tehran
 Laleh Eskandari, born 1975 in Torbat-e Heydarieh; an Iranian actress
 Reza Rafi, born August 1968 in Torbat-e Heydarieh; an Iranian writer, satirist, journalist, and showman
 Saeed Soheili, born 1959 in Torbat-e Heydarieh; an Iranian director and script writer
 Setareh Eskandari, born 15 June 1974 in Torbat-e Heydarieh; an Iranian actress

References

Sources
 Tarikh-e Torbat-e Heydarieh: ba tekiye be naqshe Ishaq Khan Qaraei, Mohammad Qaneyi

External links 

 Official Website of Torbat-e Heydarieh

Populated places in Torbat-e Heydarieh County
Cities in Razavi Khorasan Province